The PalaNorda is an indoor sporting arena located in Bergamo, Italy. It was open on 6 June 1965 and is mainly used as the home venue for volleyball and basketball clubs based in and around Bergamo, with other sporting events (tennis, fencing, artistic gymnastics, rhythmic gymnastics) taking place occasionally.

The capacity of the arena is 2,250 people. It is the home venue of Foppapedretti Bergamo (women's volleyball), Olimpia Pallavolo (men's volleyball), Blurobica (basketball), Excelsior (basketball), Bergamasca Scherma Creberg (fencing), Orobica Ginnastica (gymnastics).

References

Indoor arenas in Italy
Basketball venues in Italy
Volleyball venues in Italy
Sport in Bergamo
Buildings and structures in Bergamo
Sports venues in Lombardy
Sports venues completed in 1965
1965 establishments in Italy